Autreppes is a commune in the department of Aisne in the Hauts-de-France region of northern France and in the natural region of Thiérache.

Geography
Autreppes is located some 35 km east by northeast of Saint-Quentin and 15 km west of Hirson.  It can be accessed by the D31 road running from Saint-Algis in the west through the heart of the commune and the village and continuing east to Etreaupont. There are also many country roads covering the commune and accessing it from all directions. The commune consists entirely of farmland.

The Oise river traverses the northern part of the commune from east to west. Only one stream flows into it from the north in the commune.

Neighbouring communes and villages

History
The area was called Altripia in 876. Autreppes was part of the former royal estate given to the Abbey of Saint-Denis in 915. Then the village of Autreppes became a lordship until the French Revolution. In 1790 the commune was part of the Canton of Marly in the district of Vervins but in 1801 became part of the Canton of Vervins in the Arrondissement of Vervins.

Administration

List of Successive Mayors of Autreppes

Population

Culture and heritage

Civil heritage
The commune has a number of buildings and structures that are registered as historical monuments:
A Schoolteacher's House at 10 Rue Bernard-Lefèvre (1823)
A Railway Station at Rue du Gîte (1909)
A Spinning Mill at 13 Rue Jean-Pierre-Lefèvre (1850)
A House at 4 Rue Jean-Pierre-Lefèvre (1804)
The Town Hall / School at Place de la Mairie (1879)
A Farmhouse at 24 Rue de Vervins (1865)

Other sites of interest
The Axe Vert (Green Axis) is a hiking trail built on the old Guise-Hirson railway trackbed which forms part of the GR 122 walking trail.

Religious heritage

The commune has two religious buildings that are registered as historical monuments:
A former Presbytery (1778)
The Parish Church of Saint-Hilaire (1632) The Church contains many items that are registered as historical objects:
A Rock Frame (18th century)
A Chasuble, Stole, Maniple, and a Chalice cover (19th century)
An Altar Painting: Assumption (16th century)
A Painting: Presentation of the Virgin in the Temple (17th century)
A Reliquary Cross of Saint Hilaire of Poitiers (1758)
A Cross: Christ on the Cross (18th century)
A Confessional Door (18th century)
A Statue: Virgin and child called Our Lady of Victories (19th century)
A Funeral Cross for François Demarle (1814)
A Tabernacle (17th century)
A set of 2 Consoles (18th century)
A set of 6 Stained glass windows of people (1961)
A Stained glass window: Saint Augustin (Bay 7) (19th century)
A set of 4 Pews (18th century)

The Church Picture Gallery

Other religious sites of interest
An oratory

Notable people linked to the commune
Bernard and Jean-Pierre Lefèvre - two young people killed during the war in Algeria. The two main streets of the commune are named after them.

See also
Communes of the Aisne department

References

External links
Autreppes on the old National Geographic Institute website 
Terascia, a website dedicated to Thiérache 
40000 Bell Towers website 
Autreppes on Géoportail, National Geographic Institute (IGN) website 
Autreppe on the 1750 Cassini Map

Communes of Aisne